Norman Casmir (born 16 October 1930) is a German fencer. He competed in the individual and team foil events at the 1952 Summer Olympics.

References

1930 births
Living people
German male fencers
Olympic fencers of West Germany
Fencers at the 1952 Summer Olympics